Peter Pascual (c. 1227 – 1299/1300), in Latin originally Petrus Paschasius (Spanish: Pedro Pascual, Valencian : Pere Pasqual), was a supposed Mozarabic theologian, bishop, and martyr. His very existence has been called into question by recent scholarship.

Born in Valencia under the Almohads, he went to the University of Paris in 1238, shortly before Valencia fell to James I of Aragon. He may have held a canonry at the Cathedral of Saint Mary in Valencia before 1250, when he resigned it to join the Mercedarians at Rome. He later served James I as a tutor to his son Sancho, whom he also served as an assistant during the latter's archiepiscopate at Toledo. He became a wide-ranging preacher, delivering sermons in Tuscany and Andalusia, and writing tracts on various theological controversies. The authenticity of many works attributed to him is suspect, and it is possible that there were two writers of the same name.

In 1296 he was appointed Bishop of Jaén, but was captured by the Kingdom of Granada and held captive for three years before being beheaded at Granada. He is listed in the Roman Martyrology on October 23.

References

People from Valencia
Spanish Christian theologians
Bishops of Jaén
1299 deaths
13th-century Roman Catholic martyrs
Year of birth unknown
Medieval Spanish theologians
Mercedarian saints
13th-century Roman Catholic theologians
Beatifications by Pope Clement X
Year of birth uncertain